Azmi Mohamed (born 25 August 1971) is a Malaysian former professional footballer and the head coach who is currently the manager of Harini FT.

Playing career
A football striker with Johor and Negeri Sembilan in the 1990s, Azmi also played in the Malaysia national under-23 football team and the Malaysia national football team . Azmi playing honour includes winning the 1998 Malaysia FA Cup with Johor.

Coaching career

Johor FA , Johor FC and Johor Darul Takzim FC
In 2011 season, Azmi Mohamed entered in football management as Johor FA manager and guided the team to top 4 finish. Although Johor FA finished within the top spots, they couldn't put themselves for promotion spots to top flight after mid-season out of form. It is reported that he will leave for another Johor team, Johor FC for the 2012 season alongside K. Devan after he had talks with Persatuan Bolasepak Negeri Johor (PBNJ).

Mid season of the 2012 league campaign saw K. Devan resigned after Johor FC poor performance and the team filled second bottom of the table which meant that they were in relegation zone. Sazali Saidon was quickly put in-charge with Azmi Mohamed clinged his position as vice coach. The club managed to climb out of the relegation zone to 9th placed, two spot above the relegation zone.

With the appointment of the new PBNJ chairman, Tunku Mahkota of Johor (Crown Prince) Tunku Ismail Idris, Azmi Mohamed was put back as Johor FA head coach whilst Fandi Ahmad was left in-charge for the Johor club.

As of 30 July, PBNJ announced that Azmi Mohamed was appointed as Johor Darul Takzim FC head coach for the 2013 Malaysia Cup campaign after ex-head coach, Fandi Ahmad resigned on mutual consent with PBNJ.

He was announced as the new head coach of Johor Darul Takzim II F.C. from the 2014 season, the team rebranded from previous name Johor FA.

Felda United FC
Azmi joins Felda United F.C. as the new head coach replacing departed Irfan Bakti Abu Salim in January 2017, but resigned on 9 February 2017 after only 3 league games.

References

External links 
 Azmi Mohamed Profile
 A. Mohamed Profile

1966 births
Living people
Malaysian footballers
People from Johor
Association football forwards
Negeri Sembilan FA players
Malaysian people of Malay descent
Malaysian football managers